Gratis may refer to:

 Free, meaning without charge. See Gratis versus libre
 Gratis, Ohio, a village in Preble County, US
 Gratis Township, Preble County, Ohio, US

See also
 Free (disambiguation)